

Genereux Name Meaning 
Genereux is a surname. French (Généreux): nickname from généreux ‘generous’, ‘giving’.

Notable people 
Notable people with the name include:
 Arline Généreux (1897–1987)
 George Genereux (1935–1989)
 Jacques Généreux (born 1956)
 Bernard Généreux (born 1962)
 Jean-Marc Généreux (born 1962)
 Maurice Généreux

Genealogy

Surname Variations

See also 
 French ship Généreux
 R v Généreux
 Cadeaux Genereux

References